The Philippines competed at the 1976 Summer Olympics in Montreal, Canada. The Asian nation sent only fourteen athletes to Montreal, its smallest delegation since 1932, to compete in track and field, boxing, shooting, swimming and weightlifting.

Results and competitors by event

Athletics
Men's Marathon
 Victor Idava — 2:38:23 (→ 57th place)

Boxing
Men's Light Flyweight ( – 48 kg)
 Eduardo Baltar
 First Round — lost to Armando Guevara (VEN), 0:5

Men's Bantamweight ( – 54 kg)
 Reynaldo Fortaleza

Men's Featherweight ( – 57 kg)
 Ruben Mares

Shooting
Men's Free Pistol
 Arturo Macapagal

Men's Rapid Fire Pistol
 Mariano Ong

Swimming
Men's 100m Freestyle
 Gerardo Rosario

Men's 400m Freestyle
 Edwin Borja

Men's 1500m Freestyle
 Edwin Borja

Men's 100m Backstroke
 Gerardo Rosario

Men's 200m Backstroke
 Gerardo Rosario

Men's 200m Butterfly
 Edwin Borja

Women's 100m Breaststroke
 Nancy Deano

Women's 200m Breaststroke
 Nancy Deano

Women's 400m Individual Medley
 Nancy Deano

Weightlifting
Men's Flyweight
 Salvador del Rosario

Men's Bantamweight
 Arturo del Rosario

References
 Philippine Sports Commission
 Official Olympic Reports

Nations at the 1976 Summer Olympics
1976
Summer Olympics